Ubbi dubbi is a language game spoken with the English language. Originating in America in the 17th century, it was popularized by the 1972–1978 PBS children's show Zoom. When Zoom was revived in 1999 on PBS, Ubbi dubbi was again a feature of the show. Variations of Ubbi Dubbi include Obbish, Ob, Ib, Arpy Darpy, and  Iz.

Rules
Ubbi dubbi works by adding -ub-  before each vowel sound in a syllable (or, as a linguist might put it, "insert [ˈʌb] after each syllable onset"). The stress falls on the "ub" of the syllable that is stressed in the original word. In the word "hello" for example, which is stressed on the "-lo" syllable, the stress falls on the "lub" in "hubellubo".

The method of adding "ub" before each vowel sound has been described as "iterative infixation".

Examples
 Good day → "Gubood dubay"
 Speak → "spubeak"  
 Hello → "hubellubo"  
 Extra → "ubextruba"  
 Hubba Bubba bubblegum → "Hububbuba Bububbuba bubububblegubum"
 Mississippi → "Mubissubissubippubi"
 Ubbi Dubbi → "Ububbubi Dububbubi"
 Zoom → "Zuboom"
 Subaru → "Subububarubu"
 "Hi, how are you?" → "Hubi, hubow ubare yubou?"
 "We need to get to Plantation Road on time." → "Wube nubeed tuboo gubet tuboo Plubantubashubon Ruboad ubon tubime."
 "All human beings are born free and equal in dignity and rights. They are endowed with reason and conscience and should act towards one another in a spirit of brotherhood." → "Uball hubumuban bubeubings ubare buborn frubee uband ubeq-wub-al ubin dubignubituby uband rubights. Thubey ubare ubendubowed wubith rubeasubon uband cubonscubience uband shubould ubact tubowubards "w-ub-on" ubanubothuber ubin uba spubirubit ubof brubothuberhubood."

Uses
Ubbi Dubbi has also been popularized as the signature speech pattern of the cartoon character Mushmouth from the animated series Fat Albert and the Cosby Kids, voiced by Bill Cosby. Cosby also used this speech variation in his famous "Dentist" monologue to illustrate the effects of a dose of Novocaine.

It was used in the episode "Mentalo Case" from the TV series The King Of Queens, between character Spence Olchin (Patton Oswalt) and a salesman at a toy convention.

It was also used between Penny and Amy in  season 10 episode 7 of The Big Bang Theory as a means of having a secret conversation, to counter Sheldon and Leonard's use of Klingon.

In the video game Rayman Origins, the Bubble Dreamer speaks Ubbi Dubbi.

See also 
 -izzle / Dizzouble Dizzutch (a.k.a. "shizzolation")
 Javanais, a similar slang version of French
 Pig Latin
 Jeringonza, a similar language game in Spanish and Portuguese
 Rövarspråket
 Tutnese (language game)
 Farfallino alphabet

References

External links
 English to Ubbi Dubbi Translator
 Ubbi Dubbi Translator
 A how to speak tutorial on YouTube

Language games
English-based argots